The 2013–14 Maltese Second Division (also known as 2013–14 BOV 2nd Division due to sponsorship reasons) began on 13 September 2013 and ended on 26 April 2014.

Participating teams 
 Dingli Swallows
 Fgura United
 Gharghur
 Kirkop United
 Marsa F.C.
 Marsaskala F.C.
 Mdina Knights F.C.
 Mellieha
 Mqabba F.C.
 Pembroke Athleta
 San Gwann
 Senglea Athletics
 Siggiewi
 Żabbar St. Patrick F.C.

Changes from previous season
 Zebbug Rangers, Msida SJ F.C, Zurrieq F.C. and St. George's F.C. were promoted to the 2013–14 Maltese First Division. They were replaced with Dingli Swallows and Mqabba F.C., relegated from 2012–13 Maltese First Division.
Mgarr United F.C. and St. Venera Lightning F.C. were relegated to the 2013–14 Maltese Third Division. They were replaced with Senglea Athletics, Mdina Knights F.C., Marsa F.C. and Marsaskala F.C. all promoted from 2012–13 Maltese Third Division.

Final league table

Results

Top 10 scorers

External links
 2012-13 Second Division Results and Fixtures 
 Top Scorers   
 2012-13 Second Table and Records  
 Mqabba Champions  
  Pembroke and Fgura United Promoted  
 Marsaskala Relegated  
 Kirkop United Relegated 

Mal
3
Maltese Second Division seasons